Ryan Alexander Casteel (born June 6, 1991) is an American professional baseball catcher in the Atlanta Braves organization.

Career
Casteel attended Bradley Central High School in Cleveland, Tennessee. After graduating, he went unselected in the 2009 Major League Baseball (MLB) Draft under the belief he would attend the University of Tennessee. Though he had previously accepted a scholarship to attend the University of Tennessee and play college baseball for the Tennessee Volunteers on a scholarship, Casteel rejected the scholarship, and enrolled at Cleveland State Community College, also in Cleveland. This way, Casteel would be eligible for the MLB Draft earlier.

The Colorado Rockies selected Casteel in the 17th round of the 2010 MLB Draft. He began his professional career with the Casper Ghosts of the Rookie-level Pioneer League, and had a .305 batting average. The next year, he had a .273 batting average with the Tri-City Dust Devils of the Class A-Short Season Northwest League. In 2012, he played for the Asheville Tourists of the Class A South Atlantic League, and batted .279.

In 2013, he played for the Modesto Nuts of the Class A-Advanced California League. He was named a midseason All-Star and the California League's Catcher of the Year. He then played for the Melbourne Aces of the Australian Baseball League (ABL) for the 2013–14 ABL season. Casteel played in the ABL All-Star Game and won the Helms Award as the ABL's Most Valuable Player.

In 2014, Casteel played for the Tulsa Drillers of the Class AA Texas League, where he was named an All-Star. After the 2014 season, the Rockies assigned Casteel to the Salt River Rafters of the Arizona Fall League. Casteel spent the 2015 season with the Albuquerque Isotopes of the Class AAA Pacific Coast League.

In December 2016, Casteel signed a minor league contract with the Seattle Mariners.

On February 7, 2018, Casteel signed with the Lancaster Barnstormers of the Atlantic League of Professional Baseball He became a free agent following the 2018 season.

On January 25, 2019, Casteel signed a minor league contract with the Atlanta Braves. He became a free agent on November 2, 2020. On March 14, 2021, Casteel re-signed with the Braves organization on a minor league contract. He was assigned to the Braves AAA affiliate the Gwinnett Stripers.

Personal life
Casteel is married to his wife Bethany.

References

External links

1991 births
People from Chattanooga, Tennessee
Baseball players from Tennessee
Baseball catchers
Cleveland State Cougars baseball players
Casper Ghosts players
Tri-City Dust Devils players
Asheville Tourists players
Modesto Nuts players
Tulsa Drillers players
Melbourne Aces players
Living people
Salt River Rafters players
Albuquerque Isotopes players
Minor league baseball players
Jackson Generals (Southern League) players
Arkansas Travelers players
Lancaster Barnstormers players
Naranjeros de Hermosillo players
American expatriate baseball players in Mexico
Cangrejeros de Santurce (baseball) players
Liga de Béisbol Profesional Roberto Clemente catchers